The Presidential Citizens Medal is an award bestowed by the President of the United States. It is the second-highest civilian award in the United States and is second only to the Presidential Medal of Freedom. Established by executive order on November 13, 1969, by President Richard Nixon, it recognizes an individual "who has performed exemplary deeds or services for his or her country or fellow citizens." Only United States citizens are eligible for the medal, which may be awarded posthumously.
  
The medal is a disc of gilt and enamel, based on the Seal of the President of the United States, with the eagle surrounded by a wreath of leaves. The medal is suspended on a ribbon, dark blue with a light blue central stripe and white edge stripes.

Recipients 

Hubert Dickey Ballantine and Martin Mathews were jointly awarded the 1981 Citizens Medal as founders of the Mathews-Dickey Boy's Club.

The teachers Rachel Davino, Anne Marie Murphy, Lauren Rousseau, and Victoria Soto and school administrators Mary Sherlach and Dawn Hochsprung, who perished in the Sandy Hook Elementary School shooting defending their students, were jointly awarded the 2012 Citizens Medal posthumously.

See also
Awards and decorations of the United States government
List of awards for volunteerism and community service

References

External links

The White House - Presidential Citizens Medal Criteria
The White House - President Clinton Awards the Presidential Citizens Medals
Library Thing - Presidential Citizens Medal 

1969 establishments in the United States
Awards established in 1969
Civil awards and decorations of the United States